This is a list of Szombathelyi Haladás players.

A
   Leandro Marcolini Pedroso de Almeida
  Péter Andorka
  Michael Thiago Barbosa de Araujo

B
  Ferenc Babati
  Péter Balassa
  Csaba Balog
   Igor Bogdanović
  Péter Bonifert

C
  Victor Pony Carr
  Zoltán Csontos

D
  Szilárd Devecseri
  El Hadji Diouf

F
  Márk Farkas

G
   György Garics
  Richárd Guzmics
  Bence Gyurján
  Márton Gyurján

H
  Péter Halmosi

I
  Béla Illés
  Ignác Irhás
  Bence Iszlai

K
  András Kaj
  Milán Kalász
  Krisztián Kenesei
  Gábor Király
   Vladimir Koman
  István Kovács
  Zsolt Kovács
  Attila Kuttor

L
  Norbert Lattenstein
  Dániel Lengyel

M
  Balázs Molnár

N
  Gábor Nagy

O
  Márton Oross

P
  Jean-Baptiste Paternotte
  Péter Pölöskey

R
  Ferenc Rácz
  Gábor Rajos
  Dániel Rózsa

S
  Szabolcs Schimmer
  Tibor Selymes
  Nélio da Silva Melo
  Ádám Simon
  Attila Simon
  Norbert Sipos
  Máté Skriba
  Zoltán Szarka
  Tamás Szép

T
  Norbert Tóth
  Péter Tóth

U
  Roland Ugrai

V
  Péter Vörös

Szombathelyi Haladas players, List of

Association football player non-biographical articles